Pontoirakleia / Vasilitsa (old name:  Ereseli / Reseli) is a village in Kilkis regional unit of Central Macedonia, Greece. Since the 2011 local government reform it is part of the municipality Paionia. 

Its population is almost entirely comprised greeks of pontian descent

References

Populated places in Kilkis (regional unit)